This article shows the rosters of all participating teams at the Boys' U19 World Championship 2015 in Argentina.

Pool A

The following is the American roster in the 2015 FIVB Volleyball Boys' U19 World Championship.

Head Coach: Ken Shibuya

The following is the Argentinean roster in the 2015 FIVB Volleyball Boys' U19 World Championship.

Head Coach: Luis Testa

The following is the Turkish roster in the 2015 FIVB Volleyball Boys' U19 World Championship.

Head Coach: Salih Erdogan Tavaci

The following is the French roster in the 2015 FIVB Volleyball Boys' U19 World Championship.

Head Coach: Olivier Audabram

The following is the Belgian roster in the 2015 FIVB Volleyball Boys' U19 World Championship.

Head Coach: Joel Banks

Pool B

The following is the Italian roster in the 2015 FIVB Volleyball Boys' U19 World Championship.

Head Coach: Mario Barbiero

The following is the Chinese roster in the 2015 FIVB Volleyball Boys' U19 World Championship.

Head Coach: Jun Gu

The following is the Cuban roster in the 2015 FIVB Volleyball Boys' U19 World Championship.

Head Coach: Jesús Cruz Lopez

The following is the Mexican roster in the 2015 FIVB Volleyball Boys' U19 World Championship.

Head Coach: Gabriela Alarcon

The following is the Egyptian roster in the 2015 FIVB Volleyball Boys' U19 World Championship.

Head Coach: Emadeldin Nawar

Pool C

The following is the Polish roster in the 2015 FIVB Volleyball Boys' U19 World Championship.

Head Coach: Sebastian Pawlik

The following is the Iranian roster in the 2015 FIVB Volleyball Boys' U19 World Championship.

Head Coach: Reza Vakili Farjad

The following is the Bulgarian roster in the 2015 FIVB Volleyball Boys' U19 World Championship.

Head Coach: Dragan Ivanov

The following is the Chilean roster in the 2015 FIVB Volleyball Boys' U19 World Championship.

Head Coach: Ivan Villarreal

The following is the Taiwanese roster in the 2015 FIVB Volleyball Boys' U19 World Championship.

Head Coach: Lee Chia-yung

Pool D

The following is the Brazilian roster in the 2015 FIVB Volleyball Boys' U19 World Championship.

Head Coach: Percy Oncken

The following is the Russian roster in the 2015 FIVB Volleyball Boys' U19 World Championship.

Head Coach: Andrey Nozdrin

The following is the German roster in the 2015 FIVB Volleyball Boys' U19 World Championship.

Head Coach: Matus Kalny

The following is the Japanese roster in the 2015 FIVB Volleyball Boys' U19 World Championship.

Head Coach: Hiroshi Honda

The following is the Puerto Rican roster in the 2015 FIVB Volleyball Boys' U19 World Championship.

Head Coach: Julio Ruvira

See also
2015 FIVB Volleyball Girls' U18 World Championship squads

References

External links
Official website

FIVB Volleyball Boys' U19 World Championship
FIVB Boys' U19 World Championship
International volleyball competitions hosted by Argentina
2015 in Argentine sport